Fifth-seeded pair Ken Flach and Robert Seguso won the title, sharing $18,000 prize money. The third seeds Heinz Günthardt and Balázs Taróczy lost the final after being penalized the twelfth game of the second set following a dispute with the umpire.

Seeds
The top four seeds received a bye into the second round. A champion seed is indicated in bold text while text in italics indicates the round in which that seed was eliminated.

Draw

Finals

Top half

Bottom half

References

External links

1984 Grand Prix (tennis)
Men's Doubles